Narangodes confluens is a moth in the family Noctuidae first described by Shigero Sugi in 1990. It is found in Taiwan.

References

Moths described in 1990
Acontiinae